Governor Bruce may refer to:

James Bruce, 8th Earl of Elgin (1811–1863), Governor of Jamaica from 1842 to 1846 and Governor General of the Province of Canada from 1847 to 1854
Charles Andrew Bruce (1768–1810), Governor of Prince of Wales Island in 1810